Electoral history of Vladimir Zhirinovsky, Member of the State Duma (1993–2022), Deputy Chairman of the State Duma (2000–2011) and  Leader of Liberal Democratic Party (1991–2022). Liberal Democratic presidential candidate 1991, 1996, 2000, 2008, 2012 and 2018.

Presidential elections

1991

1996

2000

2008

2012

2018

State Duma elections

1993

In 1993, Vladimir Zhirinovsky ran for the State Duma from Shchyolkovsky single-member constituency, in all subsequent elections, he ran on the party list.

State Duma Chairman elections

2003

2011

Belgorod Oblast gubernatorial election, 1999

References

Vladimir Zhirinovsky
Zhirinovsky